Eurythmia yavapaella is a species of snout moth in the genus Eurhodope. It was described by Harrison Gray Dyar Jr. in 1906, and is known from the US states of Arizona and California.

Taxonomy
It was formerly treated as a subspecies of Eurythmia hospitella.

References

Moths described in 1906
Phycitinae